Yasheltau (Yäşeltaw) is a rural locality (a village) in Skvorchikhinsky Selsoviet, Ishimbaysky District, Bashkortostan, Russia. The population was 9 as of 2010. There are 2 streets.

Geography 
Yasheltau is located on the right bank of the Belaya River, 34 km south of Ishimbay (the district's administrative centre) by road. Sabashevo is the nearest rural locality.

References 

Rural localities in Ishimbaysky District